Cypoides parachinensis is a species of moth of the family Sphingidae first described by Ronald Brechlin in 2009. It is known from Myanmar.

References

Smerinthini